Rumble is a skerry in the Shetland islands of Scotland, situated roughly  east off the coast of Huxter, southeastern Whalsay. Nearby and to the north are the Flaeshans of Rumble, a series of small islets and stacks and Burlastack of Rumble lies to the east. On the northern side of the main island is an inlet, known as the Voe of Rumble. Lobsters and prawns are said to shelter here. It is also mentioned that a ship named Griften of unknown nationality was shipwrecked either here or on the Holm of Sandwick in 1611.

References

Islets of Whalsay
Uninhabited islands of Shetland
Skerries of Scotland